Amefurasshi (アメフラっシ, stylized in English as AMEFURASSHI) is a Japanese girl idol group managed by Stardust Promotion. It was formed in 2018 with five members, the 5 were former members of 3B Junior

The group debuted on November 3, 2018 with their first performance being at the "Cell Division" festival. The graduation festival of the trainee group 3B Junior.

Members 
All members are from Tokyo.

Former Members

Timeline

Discography

Singles

Albums

References 

Japanese girl groups
Child musical groups
Japanese-language singers
Musical groups established in 2018
Stardust Promotion artists
Japanese idol groups
Japanese pop music groups
Vocal quintets
2018 establishments in Japan
Musical groups from Tokyo